The Yerla River, alternatively Yerala River, is a tributary of Krishna River. It originates from the Mhaskoba hills in the north of Khatav taluka of Satara district. It runs between Vardhangad and Mahimangad ranges and its total length is about 125 km. In Satara district , it passes through Mol, Lalgun, Pusegaon, Khatav, Vaduj and Nimsod. Later in Sangli district  it joins Krishna River near Brahmanal.
The Yerala is nonperennial river. This river is a major source of irrigation in the eastern part of Satara district and Sangli district in Maharashtra and helpful for seasonal agriculture production. The drainage network influences the economic and social development of people.

Places and Temples 
The first holy place on the river is Mhaskoba Temple, where the river originates. This temple is located near to village Mol in north of Khatav taluka. After flowing in the south-east direction, the major attraction on this river is the Nagnath Temple of Lord Shiva at Nagnathwadi near Lalgun. Later the river enters in Ner dam which is an attractive place for seasonal migratory birds. In Pusegaon there is a famous temple of Shri Sevagiri Maharaj on the bank of Yerala river. At Yeralwadi near Banpuri village the beautiful Yeralwadi dam is constructed on this river at the south of Vaduj. The region of Yeralwadi Dam is a birding hotspot in Satara district. Greater flamingoes, winter migratory ducks, waders have a great diversity in this region. Brahmanal in Sangli district has a beautiful confluence of river Yerala and river Krishna.

Dams 

 Near Ner village in Khatav taluka, Ner Dam is located on the upper side of Yerla River. It is the source of irrigation for the northern part of Khatav taluka.
 At Yeralwadi near Banpuri village the Yeralwadi dam is constructed on this river at the south of Vaduj.

References

Rivers of Maharashtra